Kandankary is a small village in Kerala, India. It is located in Champakulam Panchayat in Kuttanad Taluk.

Geography 
It is presumed that this region (most part of Kuttanad) was a very big forest in ancient years, but later destroyed by a forest fire. It is still possible to see "kari" (coal) if we dig deep into the soil. So this place name end-up with Kari. The main source of income is agriculture. The rice fields are a key feature of the place. The village is located on the banks of the Pamba River. This village is known for its ancient temple Kandakarykkavu Devi Temple and St. Joseph's Church and DVHSS Kandankary.

Kandankary is located 18 km from Changanacherry,19 km from Alappuzha & 44 km from Kottayam.

Economy 

Due to the good soil and availability of water, paddy cultivation is traditionally practiced by most people here.Therefore, paddy cultivation can be seen in abundance here. After harvest, the fields are irrigated and fish farming is started. This is another source of income for the farmers here.

Shrines 

 Kandankary Kavu Devi Temple

 St. Joseph's Church Kandankary

School 

 D V Higher Secondary School

Transportation 

 (K.S.R.TC) Kerala State Road Transport Corporation

 (S.W.T.D) State Water Transport Department

Major Attractions 

 Paddy view point
 Sunset View point
 Ferry Boating
 Fishing
 The road in the middle of the field is an ideal place for an evening walk to enjoy the natural beauty.

Gallery

References 

Villages in Alappuzha district